Forest-l'Abbaye is a commune in the Somme department in Hauts-de-France in northern France.

Geography

History
There was a station on the Réseau des Bains de Mer located on the line from Abbeville to Dompierre-sur-Authie, opened on 19 June 1892. Forest-l'Abbaye was the junction for the branch of the Réseau des Bains de Mer to Noyelles-sur-Mer, which opened on 24 August 1892. The station and both lines closed to passengers on 10 March 1947. The line to Abbeville closed to freight on that date, but the line to Noyelles remained open to freight until 1 February 1951.

Population

See also
Communes of the Somme department
Réseau des Bains de Mer

References

Communes of Somme (department)